|}

The Park Hill Stakes is a Group 2 flat horse race in Great Britain open to fillies and mares aged three years or older. It is run at Doncaster over a distance of 1 mile, 6 furlongs and 115 yards (2,922 metres), and it is scheduled to take place each year in September.

History
The event is named after Park Hill, an estate formerly owned by Anthony St. Leger, the founder of Doncaster's most famous race, the St. Leger Stakes. The Park Hill Stakes was established in 1839, and it was originally restricted to three-year-old fillies.

The victory of Blink Bonny in 1857 provoked a riot among spectators who believed she had been dishonestly prevented from winning the previous day's St. Leger.

The present system of race grading was introduced in 1971, and the Park Hill Stakes was initially given Group 2 status. It was opened to fillies and mares aged four or older and relegated to Group 3 level in 1991. It was promoted back to Group 2 in 2004.

The Park Hill Stakes is currently held on the second day of Doncaster's four-day St. Leger Festival. It is sometimes referred to as the Fillies' St. Leger.

Records
Most successful horse:
 no horse has won this race more than once

Leading jockey (7 wins):
 Frankie Dettori -  Anna of Saxony (1993), Noble Rose (1995), Echoes in Eternity (2004), Eastern Aria (2010), Meeznah (2011), Free Wind (2021), Mimikyu (2022) 

Leading trainer (7 wins):
 John Scott – Mickleton Maid (1839), Sally (1842), Peggy (1843), Canezou (1848), Honeysuckle (1854), Hepatica (1858), Toison d'Or (1869)
 Noel Murless – Bara Bibi (1954), Collyria (1959), Bracey Bridge (1965), Pink Gem (1967, dead-heat), Parmelia (1970), Attica Meli (1972), Mil's Bomb (1974)

Winners since 1975

 The 2006 running took place at York over 1 mile, 5 furlongs and 197 yards.

Earlier winners

 1839: Mickleton Maid
 1840: Calypso
 1841: Disclosure
 1842: Sally
 1843: Peggy
 1844: Sorella
 1845: Miss Sarah
 1846: Ennui
 1847: Ellerdale
 1848: Canezou
 1849: Lady Evelyn
 1850: Tiff
 1851: Aphrodite
 1852: Bird on the Wing
 1853: Mayfair
 1854: Honeysuckle
 1855: Clotilde
 1856: Melissa
 1857: Blink Bonny
 1858: Hepatica
 1859: Qui Vive
 1860: Lady Trespass
 1861: Brown Duchess
 1862: Imperatrice
 1863: Fantail
 1864: Battaglia
 1865: White Duck
 1866: Lass o'Gowrie
 1867: filly by Wild Dayrell
 1868: Athena
 1869: Toison d'Or
 1870: Agility
 1871: Hopbine
 1872: Maid of Perth
 1873: Marie Stuart
 1874: Aventuriere
 1875: Skotzka
 1876: Twine the Plaiden
 1877: Lady Golightly
 1878: Jannette
 1879: Peace
 1880: Experiment
 1881: Bal Gal
 1882: Shotover
 1883: Britomartis
 1884: Belinda
 1885: Hurry
 1886: Miss Jummy
 1887: Porcelain
 1888: Belle Mahone
 1889: Minthe
 1890: Ponza
 1891: Cereza
 1892: Gantlet
 1893: Self Sacrifice
 1894: Amiable
 1895: Bass
 1896: Canterbury Pilgrim
 1897: Galatia
 1898: Lowood
 1899: Irish Ivy
 1900: Goosander
 1901: St Aldegonde
 1902: Elba
 1903: Quintessence
 1904: Pretty Polly
 1905: Adula
 1906: Demure
 1907: Jubilee
 1908: Siberia
 1909: Electra
 1910: Yellow Slave
 1911: Hair Trigger II
 1912: Eufrosina
 1913: Arda
 1914: First Spear
 1915–18: no race
 1919: Flying Spear
 1920: Redhead
 1921: Love in Idleness
 1922: Selene
 1923: Brownhylda
 1924: Charley's Mount
 1925: Juldi
 1926: Glasheen
 1927: Cinq a Sept
 1928: Girandola
 1929: Nuwara Eliya
 1930: Glorious Devon
 1931: Volume
 1932: Fury
 1933: Typhonic
 1934: Poker
 1935: Fox Lair
 1936: Traffic Light
 1937: Nadushka
 1938: Gainly
 1939–40: no race
 1941: Bright Lady 1
 1942–45: no race
 1946: Procne
 1947: Mitrailleuse
 1948: Vertencia
 1949: Sea Idol
 1950: La Baille
 1951: Verse
 1952: Moon Star
 1953: Kerkeb
 1954: Bara Bibi
 1955: Ark Royal
 1956: Kyak
 1957: Almeria
 1958: Cutter
 1959: Collyria
 1960: Sunny Cove
 1961: Never Say
 1962: Almiranta
 1963: Outcrop
 1964: Cursorial
 1965: Bracey Bridge
 1966: Parthian Glance
 1967: Pia / Pink Gem 2
 1968: Bringley
 1969: Aggravate
 1970: Parmelia
 1971: Example
 1972: Attica Meli
 1973: Reload
 1974: Mil's Bomb

1 The 1941 running took place at Newmarket.2 The 1967 race was a dead-heat and has joint winners.

See also
 Horse racing in Great Britain
 List of British flat horse races

References

 Paris-Turf: 
 Racing Post:

 galopp-sieger.de – Park Hill Stakes.
 horseracingintfed.com – International Federation of Horseracing Authorities – Park Hill Stakes (2018).
 pedigreequery.com – Park Hill Stakes – Doncaster.
 

Flat races in Great Britain
Doncaster Racecourse
Long-distance horse races for fillies and mares
Recurring sporting events established in 1839
1839 establishments in England